Langfang is a prefecture-level city of Hebei Province, which was known as Tianjin Prefecture until 1973. It was renamed Langfang Prefecture after Tianjin became a municipality and finally upgraded into a prefecture-level city in 1988. Langfang is located approximately midway between Beijing and Tianjin. Langfang borders Baoding to the southwest, Cangzhou to the south (both prefecture-level cities of Hebei), Beijing to the north and Tianjin to the east. Sanhe City and Dachang Hui County are now conurbated with Beijing, so that they form part of the same built-up area. Langfang is the smallest prefecture-level city of Hebei Province by land area.

Administrative divisions
Langfang consists of 2 county-level districts, 2 county-level cities, 5 counties, 1 autonomous county, and one economic development zone.

Development district:


Geography

Considering Langfang's position between these two prominent cities, it is a relatively green city. Every  along the city's major streets are parks where local people stroll and take exercise. Langfang's five-kilometer long pedestrian street is now the longest in China. On the other hand, air pollution is a severe problem and in 2013 it was ranked among the 10 worst cities in China for air pollution, along with 6 other cities in Hebei including Xingtai, Shijiazhuang, Baoding, Handan, Hengshui and Tangshan, are among China's 10 most polluted cities.

The "Northern Three Counties" Exclave 
The "Northern Three Counties of Langfang" exclave, separated from the rest of the province, is a part of Langfang City. The exclave comprises Sanhe City, Xianghe County, and Dachang Hui Autonomous County and is located between the municipalities of Beijing and Tianjin.

Climate

History

On June 26, 1900, during the Boxer Movement, belligerent European forces heading towards Beijing were stopped by Boxers at the Battle of Langfang, and were defeated and forced to turn back to Tianjin. The Chinese forces were victorious.

It was the site of another battle during the Second Sino-Japanese War.

Economy
Langfang's economy emphasizes computers and technology and manufacturing. To that effect Langfang is home to an Export Processing Zone, an area for factories, and the Oriental University City, a 4-billion yuan investment that began construction in 1999, where some 30 universities enroll about 50,000 students.

There are two national oil and gas companies based in Langfang. The China Petroleum Pipeline Bureau, the primary builder of pipelines in China, and the ENN Group, a natural gas company, are both based in the city.

Development Zone
Langfang Export Processing Zone
The Langfang Export Processing Zone (Langfang EPZ) was established by the State Council in 2005. It has a planned area of 0.5 km2 and commenced operation in October 2008. It is the only state-level development zone in Langfang. Langfang EPZ is located in the Langfang Economic and Technical Development Zone (Langfang ETDZ), which is a province-level development zone.

Transport

Langfang contains part of the Beijing Daxing International Airport , opened in September 2019. It is also only a one-hour drive from Beijing Capital International Airport  and the Tianjin New Port. The Langfang North railway station serves the older Beijing–Shanghai railway, while the newer Langfang railway station opened in July 2011 as the penultimate stop on the Beijing–Shanghai high-speed railway.

References

External links

 Official website 
 http://www.langfang.net/
 https://web.archive.org/web/20090122140613/http://www.langfangtv.com/ - TV station
 http://www.lfnews.cn - news
 http://www.lfsfxy.edu.cn Langfang Teachers College

 
Cities in Hebei
Prefecture-level divisions of Hebei
Enclaves and exclaves